Essex County Cricket Club is one of the 18 member clubs of the English County Championship, representing the historic county of Essex.  The club was established on 14 January 1876 and has played first-class cricket since 1894, List A cricket since 1963 and Twenty20 cricket since 2003.  Unlike most professional sports, in which a team usually has a single fixed home ground, county cricket clubs have traditionally used different grounds in various towns and cities within the county for home matches, although the use of minor "out grounds" has diminished since the 1980s.   Essex have played first class, List A, or Twenty20 matches at 14 different grounds.

The club's debut home fixture in first-class cricket was played at the County Ground in Leyton against Leicestershire in 1894.  This ground remained the county's headquarters and principal match venue until the end of the 1933 season and was used regularly for over 80 years. As of 2022 it has still hosted more of the county's first-class matches than any other ground.  Essex played their final match at the venue in 1977, however, since when the similarly-named County Ground in Chelmsford has hosted the majority of first-class games.  The ground in Leyton has continued to be used for matches in local competitions.

The club's first home List A fixture took place in 1965 against Derbyshire at the Old County Ground in Brentwood.  This venue had been used since the 1920s for first-class matches, but only staged two List A matches, and its use was discontinued altogether in 1969.  The County Ground in Chelmsford played host to the club's first home Twenty20 fixture in 2003, against Kent, and has since hosted every one of the county's home Twenty20 matches with the exception of a single game in 2014 which was played at Castle Park in Colchester.

Essex traditionally staged annual "cricket festivals" in the towns of Colchester, Ilford and Southend-on-Sea, which usually consisted of two first-class matches over the course of a week, and later incorporated one List A match following the introduction of that format.  The Ilford event was abandoned following the 2002 season.  The Southend festival moved from its traditional home at Southchurch Park to Garon Park in 2005, making the latter venue the county's only new home ground of the 21st century.  Following the 2011 season, however, Essex discontinued the Southend festival altogether, leaving Castle Park in Colchester as the only venue regularly used by the county other than its main base in Chelmsford. The Colchester festival was not held in 2017, and all the county's home games were played at Chelmsford; the Colchester festival has remained suspended.

Grounds
Below is a complete list of grounds used by Essex County Cricket Club for first-class, List A and Twenty20 matches.  Statistics are complete through to the end of the 2022 season.  Only matches played by Essex CCC at the grounds are recorded in the table.  Matches abandoned without any play occurring are not included.

Notes
A.  First-class cricket matches are designed to be contested over multiple days, with each team permitted two innings with no limit to the number of overs in an innings.  List A matches are intended to be completed in a single day and restrict each team to a single innings of between 40 and 60 overs, depending on the specific competition.  Twenty20 matches restrict each team to a single innings of 20 overs.

B.  The Essex Cricket Board played four List A matches at the County Ground between 2000 and 2003, including one match against Essex. The Essex Cricket Board is a separate organisation from Essex County Cricket Club and its matches are not included in the totals.  The match between the Board team and Essex CCC is excluded as the Board team were officially the home team.

References

Essex County Cricket Club
Cricket grounds in Essex
Essex
Essex-related lists